Stoleshnikov Pereulok or Stoleshnikov Lane is a short street with boutiques and shops with many luxury goods located within the Boulevard Ring in  central Moscow and known as one of the most expensive shopping areas in the world.

The street runs from Tverskaya Street in the west, to Petrovka Street in the east.

Gallery

References

Jewellery districts
Streets in Moscow
Shopping districts and streets in Russia